Weston is a town in Clark County in the U.S. state of Wisconsin. The population was 638 at the 2000 census. The unincorporated communities of Christie and Globe are located in the town.

Geography
According to the United States Census Bureau, the town has a total area of 36.3 square miles (94.0 km2), of which, 36.1 square miles (93.6 km2) of it is land and 0.1 square miles (0.3 km2) of it (0.36%) is water.

Demographics
As of the census of 2000, there were 638 people, 230 households, and 180 families residing in the town. The population density was 17.7 people per square mile (6.8/km2). There were 267 housing units at an average density of 7.4 per square mile (2.9/km2). The racial makeup of the town was 99.37% White, 0.16% African American, 0.31% Native American and 0.16% Asian. Hispanic or Latino of any race were 0.94% of the population.

There were 230 households, out of which 35.2% had children under the age of 18 living with them, 68.3% were married couples living together, 4.3% had a female householder with no husband present, and 21.7% were non-families. 16.5% of all households were made up of individuals, and 8.3% had someone living alone who was 65 years of age or older. The average household size was 2.77 and the average family size was 3.07.

In the town, the population was spread out, with 27.6% under the age of 18, 7.2% from 18 to 24, 28.7% from 25 to 44, 22.9% from 45 to 64, and 13.6% who were 65 years of age or older. The median age was 38 years. For every 100 females, there were 111.3 males. For every 100 females age 18 and over, there were 107.2 males.

The median income for a household in the town was $40,833, and the median income for a family was $45,833. Males had a median income of $27,417 versus $21,328 for females. The per capita income for the town was $15,478. About 14.2% of families and 17.4% of the population were below the poverty line, including 29.5% of those under age 18 and 12.6% of those age 65 or over.

References

Towns in Wisconsin
Towns in Clark County, Wisconsin